Progress M-11 was a Russian uncrewed cargo spacecraft which was launched in 1992 to resupply the Mir space station. The twenty-ninth of sixty four Progress spacecraft to visit Mir, it used the Progress-M 11F615A55 configuration, and had the serial number 212. It carried supplies including food, water and oxygen for the EO-10 crew aboard Mir, as well as equipment for conducting scientific research, and fuel for adjusting the station's orbit and performing manoeuvres. It was the first spacecraft to visit Mir following the dissolution of the Soviet Union.

Progress M-11 was launched at 07:50:16 GMT on 25 January 1992, atop a Soyuz-U2 carrier rocket flying from Site 1/5 at the Baikonur Cosmodrome. Following two days of free flight, it docked with the Forward port of Mir's core module at 09:30:43 GMT on 27 January.

Progress M-11 undocked from Mir at 08:43:40 GMT on 13 March, and was deorbited few hours later, to a destructive reentry over the Pacific Ocean at around 15:47.

See also

1992 in spaceflight
List of Progress flights
List of uncrewed spaceflights to Mir

References

Spacecraft launched in 1992
Progress (spacecraft) missions